Major-General John Shrimpton was Governor of Gibraltar.

Military career
Shrimpton joined the Army becoming a Major in the 1st (Queen's Own) Foot Guards.

In 1693, during the Nine Years' War, he was wounded at the Battle of Landen in Flanders. In 1701 he became Member of Parliament for Whitchurch.

In 1704, when the Garrison at Gibraltar came under threat from the French, a force of 2,500 troops under Shrimpton's command was dispatched to re-inforce the Garrison. Archduke Charles, acting on the recommendation of Queen Anne, asked Shrimpton to accept an appointment as Governor and he remained there until 1707.

References

British Army generals
British military personnel of the War of the Spanish Succession
Year of birth missing
Year of death missing
British Army personnel of the Seven Years' War
Grenadier Guards officers
17th-century English people
English MPs 1701–1702
English MPs 1702–1705
English MPs 1705–1707